Mash and Peas was a parodic sketch show written by and starring Matt Lucas & David Walliams. Their first television work together, it originally aired on Paramount Comedy 1 and Channel 4 between 1996 and 1997. The episodes were repeated before the channel's relaunch in 1999. The programme is made up of parodies of various television genres, introduced by the childish and incompetent Danny Mash (Lucas) and Gareth Peas (Walliams). Edgar Wright directed and long-standing collaborator Paul Putner appeared throughout.

Episode guide
1. Kids TV
 Parodies of Play Away, Tony Hart, Jackanory and Why Don't You? specifically, each with a hidden agenda - such as oppressive Christianity or entrapment - or some surprising surrealism coming to the fore.

2. American Sitcoms
 Parodies of standard American sitcoms, both domestic and blue-collar.*

3. Sex Talk
 Simon Greenall acts as host for a parody of the type of supposedly dangerous late-night sexual discussion programs that were around in the early nineties, featuring early Rock Profile-style interviews with married couples.

4. Prime Time ITV
 Parodies of Gay Byrne's hosting of The Late Late Show, Michael Barrymore's hosting in general, Victoria Wood's comedy and two old women talk over Wish You Were Here...?.

5. Late Night ITV
 Parodies of contemporary presenter Gaz Top, late night video review shows, television producer Mike Mansfield's contemporary music show and Richard Littlejohn's journalistic nature.

6. Boy Band Documentary
 Spoof documentary on a dim, up and coming, manufactured Take That-style band.

7. British On The Box
 A full parody of Garry Bushell and the type of television and bigotry he inhabits.

8. Strange Phenomenums
 A take on the early 1990s mystery science-fiction sensation, parodying cheap shows that sprang up in the wake of The X-Files, including the likes of TV psychics and Michael Aspel's Strange but True?. It is unclear as to whether videotape of this edition still exists.

In addition to these, in 1997, four sketches very similar in tone to the American sitcoms edition (one of which was a remake of a A Puppet Lives In My House - with the only major difference being that Jessica Stevenson's role was now taken by Rebecca Front) were produced for a Sitcoms Night which was made in partnership between Paramount Comedy 1 and Channel 4.

The remaining sketches were - My Gay Dads in which one typical American teenage girl is beset with three loud homosexual fathers, a US remake of Only Fools and Horses entitled Only Jerks and Horses and a Seinfeld parody I'm Bland (but my friends are krazy!). Also appearing in these sketches were Bob Mortimer, Reece Shearsmith, Steve Pemberton, Mark Gatiss and Simon Greenall.

Shortly before transmission, Lucas and Walliams appeared in-character to publicise the show on Dominik Diamond's Paramount chat show Night O'Plenty. Later, the pair also appeared as Mash and Peas in a number of music videos by Fat Les, made between 1998 and 2000, including the famous 'Vindaloo'.

Soon after this Lucas & Walliams created Sir Bernard's Stately Homes, before soon achieving recognition with Play UK's Rock Profile and, their most successful work, Little Britain.

References
 

Channel 4 comedy
1990s British television sketch shows
1996 British television series debuts
1997 British television series endings
English-language television shows